The Plains of Heaven is a 1982 Australian film directed by Ian Pringle, about two men at a remote satellite relay station who contemplate their obsessions.

Ian Pringle shared the Interfilm Award win for The Plains of Heaven at the Mannheim-Heidelberg International Film festival in 1982.

Cast
Richard Moir as Barker
Reg Evans as Cunningham
Gerard Kennedy as Lenko
John Flaus as Landrover owner
Jenny Cartledge as Nurse
Brian McKenzie as Lewis

Production
The film was made for a budget of $100,000, which came to $160,000 after deferrals and a marketing grant. $60,000 came from the Creative Development Branch of the Australian Film Commission and the film was shot at Falls Creek in the Bogong High Plans over four weeks. Pringle says the film ran out of money three weeks into the shoot but they managed to find more to finish it.

References

External links

The Plains of Heaven at Oz Movies

1982 films
Australian drama films
Films directed by Ian Pringle
1982 drama films
1980s English-language films
1980s Australian films